Armorial of the Communes of Oise due to its length, it is split into 4 sub pages :
 Armorial of the Communes of Oise (A–C)
 Armorial of the Communes of Oise (D–H)
 Armorial of the Communes of Oise (I–P)
 Armorial of the Communes of Oise (Q–Z)

Together, these pages lists the armoury (emblazons=graphics and blazons=heraldic descriptions; or coats of arms) of the communes in Oise (department 60)

Sources
Heraldry of the World: Oise

Oise
Oise